Na. Parthasarathy (18 December 1932 – 13 December 1987), was a writer of Tamil historical novels from Tamil Nadu, India. In 1971, he was awarded the Sahitya Akademi Award for Tamil for his novel Samudhaya Veedhi. He was also a journalist who worked in Kalki, Dina Mani Kadhir and later ran a magazine called Deepam. He was known as Deepam Parthasarathy due to his magazine. He also published under various pet names like Theeran, Aravindan, Manivannan, Ponmudi, Valavan, Kadalazhagan, Ilampooranan and Sengulam Veerasinga Kavirayar.

Bibliography

Novels
Saingala megangal
Manipallavam
Aathmavin Ragangal
Kurunchi Malar
Ponvilangu
Nisabda Sangeedham
Samudhaya Veedhi
Rani Mangammal
Thulasi Maadam
Pandi madevi
Nithilavalli
Vanjimaanagaram
Sathiya Vellam
Verri Muzhakkam
Sundara Kanavugal
  moolakanal
  Kapaadapuram
  Puthiya Paalam

References

External links
Books of Na. Parathasarathy at chennailibrary.com
Books of Na. Parathasarathy at noolulagam.com

1932 births
1987 deaths
Indian historical novelists
Recipients of the Sahitya Akademi Award in Tamil
Tamil writers
Indian Tamil people
Journalists from Tamil Nadu
20th-century Indian novelists
Indian editors
Novelists from Tamil Nadu